Eddie Baroo (born 25 September 1968) is an Australian actor, screenwriter, singer and guitarist. He is the lead singer and frontman of the band Stodgewood. His notable films are Red Hill (2010), Crawlspace (2012), and The Dry (2020).

Selected filmography

Film

Television

References

External links
 

1968 births
Living people
Australian male film actors
Australian male television actors
Australian screenwriters
Male actors from Geelong